The 1916 Mississippi Normal Normalites football team was an American football team that represented Mississippi Normal College (now known as the University of Southern Mississippi) as an independent during the 1916 college football season. In their third year under head coach A. B. Dille, the team compiled an 0–3 record. Official records indicate a further five games were played by Normal, but the scores from them are unknown.

Schedule

References

Mississippi Normal
Southern Miss Golden Eagles football seasons
College football winless seasons
Mississippi Normal Normalites football